Senario is a Malaysian sketch comedy troupe responsible for their titular show (also called Senario) that had aired on TV3 from June 1996 to 2013, in which due to its popularity has also spawned a franchise of comedy films featuring its cast.

Members
The troupe started off as finalists and one of the host of the TV3-run talent show Sinaran Pasport Kegemilangan that took place in the early 1990s with 7 members in its inception. Some of its original cast had undergone several replacements during its 17-year-long run; whereas only Mazlan Ahmad (stage name: Lan Pet-Pet), Azlee Jaafar and Abdul Wahid (stage name:Wahid) remain as the core members of the troupe.

 Abdul Wahid (1996-present)
 Mazlan Ahmad (1996-present)
 Azlee Jaafar (1996-present)
 Shamsul Ghau Ghau (1996)
 Farouk Hussain (1996) 
 Ilya Buang (1996-1998, 2006-2008)
 Hamdan Ramli (1996-1998, 2006-2008)
 Saiful Apek (1998-2004)
 Yassin Yahya (1999-2002)

History 

The Senario group was established in 1996 as a result of a combination of 6 participants of the Sinaran Pasport Kegemilangan together with the host of the tv competition programme, Farouk Hussain. The Farouk-hosted competition was running in early 90's and in 1994 season, Shamsul Ghau Ghau was crowned as the champion and Mazlan Ahmad became the runner-up.

The group was originally composed of Farouk Hussain as the leader of the Senario group, and members of the group Wahid, Ilya, Hamdan, Shamsul, Azlee and Mazlan. The name of the group, Senario is taken from the idea of Farouk who called them a "noisy" group, "senang riuh" (English: getting loud easily) and eventually became Senario after being re-inspired by Shamsul Ghau Ghau. They were entrusted with the success of their own TV program, also named Senario in June 1996 with four introductory episodes featuring comedy characters. Apparently, the comedy sitcom has been well received and they earned their permanent spot at TV3 channel.

Soon, Farouk and Shamsul left Senario and the group moved with five members until eventually Ilya and Hamdan also resigned around 1998. Then Senario welcomed their fourth entry, Saiful Apek and then became five with the arrival of Yassin Yahya. Senario reached its zenith as a comedian group with five members consisting of Wahid, Azlee, Lan, Yassin and Saiful Apek. However, in 2002, Yassin withdrew from Senario because his contract had expired and there was controversy with narcotics use until Senario's name was slightly tarnished. Subsequently, Saiful Apek also resigned from Senario because he wanted to move solo in 2004, which marked the hiatus in Senario career. After 2005, Azlee, Lan and Wahid were the only members of Senario left and they were still active until the group's second hiatus in 2013. After the almost one full year of break, the group has gained publicity for their role in shaping and paving the paths for new generation of Malaysian comedians to shine.

In 2014, the Senario Group was awarded Anugerah Komedi Sepanjang Zaman. All members of the Scenario Group were present at the Anugerah Lawak Warna 2014 for the reception of the recognition.

Starting in 2017, Senario together with former group members such as Hamdan, Ilya, Saiful Apek and Yassin have recreated with a new name form on Senariounion. The group would also like to re-invite the earliest members such as Shamsul Ghau-Ghau and Farouk Hussein (invited appearance).

Throughout their careers Senario was the first legal group that competed in Anugerah Juara Lagu and managed to reach the final stages of the competition in 2001 and 2006. This marked a history in the music industry in the country because Senario managed to give something other singers could not offer since all of their songs have lyrics that consist the elements of advice not only comedy in nature.

Their achievements in the field of singing is proven as a great success for Senario itself, which subsequently opened many business opportunities, deals and ventures in food and beverages industry by using Senario as a brand.

Senario signed many film franchise deals throughout their careers with different film directors such as Aziz M. Osman who directed 5 films i.e., Senario The Movie (1999), Senario Lagi (2000), Lagi-Lagi Senario ( 2001), Senario XX (2005) and Senario Pemburu Emas Yamashita (2006). Other Senario films are Lang Buana (2003) directed by Mamat Khalid, Senario The Movie: Episode 1 (2008) and Senario The Movie: Episode 2 - Beach Boys (2009) directed by Ahmad Idham, Senario Asam Garam (2010) directed by Hatta Azad Khan and Senario The Movie Ops Pocot (2011) directed by Ismail 'Bob' Hashim.

Senario is very well-respected in Malaysia and considered as one of the early influencers. Every dialogue in their weekly sketches will be emulated by publics in their daily conversations. Their comedy is always regarded as a high class comedy instead of obscene nature of other comedians, thus capturing the hearts of Malaysians from all walks of life.

Media

Album
 Senario (1997)
 Senario 2 (1998)
 Senario The Movie Soundtrack
 Senario 3 - Seantero (2000)
 Lagi Lagi Senario Soundtrack
 Senario Can Mali Can (2001)
 Senario 4 (2001)
 Senario 5 (2005)

Television
 Senario (1996 - 2013)
 Senario Misteri Bamboo (2011-2012)

Film
 Senario The Movie (1999)
 Senario Lagi (2000)
 Lagi-Lagi Senario (2001)
 Lang Buana (2003)
 Senario XX (2005)
 Senario Pemburu Emas Yamashita (2006)
 Senario The Movie : Episode 1 (2008)
 Senario The Movie : Episode 2 - Beach Boys (2010)
 Senario Asam Garam (2010)
 Senario The Movie Ops Pocot (2011)

Reality Show
 Senario Gelak Kaya (2004) - as host

References

Malaysian comedy television series
Comedy troupes